Fats Kaplin is an American musician, born in New York City. He is best known as a fiddler. He also plays guitar, button accordion, banjo, mandolin, steel guitar, an Arab oud, and a Turkish cümbüş, among others. He has worked with artists such as Jack White, Trisha Yearwood,  The Tractors, Nanci Griffith, Pure Prairie League, John Prine, Roy Bookbinder and Beck.

He currently resides in Nashville, Tennessee and is married to musician Kristi Rose. In 2003, he started playing with fellow country artists and Nashville residents Kieran Kane and Kevin Welch, as Kane Welch Kaplin.

Discography
This Is Pulp Country!, 2004
The Fatman Cometh, 2006
Fats Kaplins' World of Wonder Downunder, 2009 
Waking Hour, 2011 (David Francy) — fiddle
Morning Phase, 2014 (Beck) - banjo

With Kristi Rose
I Wonder As I Wander, 2010
You're Still Around, 2011

With Kane Welch Kaplin
You Can't Save Everybody, 2004
Lost John Dean, 2006
Kane Welch Kaplin, 2007

References

American fiddlers
Musicians from New York City
Living people
Year of birth missing (living people)
21st-century violinists
Pure Prairie League members